Amuhenkanda Grama Niladhari Division is a Grama Niladhari Division of the Eheliyagoda Divisional Secretariat, of Ratnapura District, of Sabaragamuwa Province, Sri Lanka.

Demographics

Ethnicity

Religion

References 

Ratnapura District